The Finnish International is an international open badminton tournament held in Finland since 2014. Up to 2013, the Finnish Open has been named Finnish International. In 2014,  the second international tournament in Finland launched as Finnish International, then the original tournament changed its title to Finnish Open.

Previous winners

External links
Yonex Finnish International 2014

Badminton tournaments in Finland
Sports competitions in Finland
Recurring sporting events established in 2014